Sia or Saa, an ancient Egyptian god, was the deification of perception in the Heliopolitan Ennead cosmogony and is probably equivalent to the intellectual energies of the heart of Ptah in the Memphite cosmogeny. He also had a connection with writing and was often shown in anthropomorphic form holding a papyrus scroll. This papyrus was thought to embody intellectual achievements. 

It was said that Atum created the two gods Sia and Hu from his blood spilled while cutting his own penis, a possible reference to circumcision.

Sia appeared standing on the solar barque during its journey through the night in New Kingdom underworld texts and tomb decorations, together with Hu, the "creative utterance," and Heka, the god of magic. These gods were seen as special powers helping the creator, and although Heka had his own cult Sia did not.

Hieroglyph: Sia

The Sia (hieroglyph) was also used to represent "to perceive", "to know" or "to be cognizant".

References

Death gods
Egyptian gods
Wisdom gods
Egyptian hieroglyphs